Plesiophantes is a genus of sheet weavers that was first described by S. Heimer in 1981.<ref name=Heim1981>{{cite journal| last=Heimer| first=S.| year=1981| title=Plesiophantes joosti gen. et sp. n. (Arachnida, Araneae, Linyphiidae)| journal=Reichenbachia| pages=197–201| volume=19}}</ref>

Species
 it contains three species:Plesiophantes joosti Heimer, 1981 (type) – Russia, Georgia, TurkeyPlesiophantes simplex Tanasevitch, 1987 – GeorgiaPlesiophantes tanasevitchi'' Wunderlich, 2011 – Russia

See also
 List of Linyphiidae species (I–P)

References

Araneomorphae genera
Linyphiidae
Spiders of Asia